The Office of Situational Awareness (OSA), formerly Office of Operations Coordination, is a component of the headquarters of the United States Department of Homeland Security. OPS is responsible for ensuring timely and robust information sharing within and external to the Department. 

Primarily through the National Operations Center, the Office is a key touchpoint for coordinating operational issues with federal, state, tribal, local governments Homeland Security Advisors, law enforcement partners, and private sector critical infrastructure operators, and international partners. In accordance with Homeland Security Presidential Directive 8 (Annex I), OPS is facilitating a Federal interagency planning effort to address various national contingencies. The Office is headed by RADM (Ret.) Christopher Tomney.

OPS oversees the National Operations Center (NOC), which collects homeland security information, both classified and unclassified, from federal, state, territorial, tribal, local, and private sector partners as well as social media.

Organization
Information is shared and fused on a daily basis by the two halves of the Office, the "Intelligence Side" and the "Law Enforcement Side".  The two halves function in tandem.  The Intelligence watch floor gathers intelligence and decides how it contributes to the current threats in a given area.  The Law Enforcement Side tracks law enforcement activities across the country that may have a terrorist nexus.  This information from the two halves accurately depicts the nation's threat environment at any moment.

Through the National Operations Center, the Office provides real-time situational awareness and monitoring of the homeland, coordinates incidents and response activities, and, in conjunction with the Office of Intelligence and Analysis, issues advisories and bulletins concerning threats to homeland security, as well as specific protective measures. The NOC coordinates information sharing to help deter, detect, and prevent terrorist acts and to manage domestic incidents. Information on domestic incident management is shared with Emergency Operations Centers at all levels through the Homeland Security Information Network (HSIN).

References

 

United States Department of Homeland Security